Brazil sent a team of 203 athletes to compete in the 2015 Summer Universiade held in Gwangju, South Korea from July 3 to 17, 2013.

Medalists

Medals by sports

Aquatics

Swimming

Men

Water Polo

Men

Group A

Archery

Men

Women

Athletics

Men
Track & road events

Field events

Key
Note–Ranks given for track events are within the athlete's heat only
Q = Qualified for the next round
q = Qualified for the next round as a fastest loser or, in field events, by position without achieving the qualifying target
NR = National record
N/A = Round not applicable for the event
Bye = Athlete not required to compete in round
NM = No mark

Badminton

Mixed

Basketball

Men

Group D

|}

Women

Group D

|}

9th to 16th place

13th to 16th place

Fencing

Men

Women

Football

Men

Group C

Quarterfinals

Semifinals

Bronze-medal match

Women

Group C

Quarterfinals

5th–8th place

5th place game

Golf

Men

Gymnastics

Artistic
Men
Team & Individual Qualification

Qualification Legend: Q = Qualified to apparatus final

Rhythmic

Handball

Men

Group B

7th place match

Women

Group B

5th place match

Judo

Men

Women

Team

Rowing

Men

Women

Shooting

Men

Women

Table Tennis

Singles

Doubles

Taekwondo

Men

Women

Tennis

Men

Volleyball

Men

Group C

|}

|}

9th–16th quarterfinals

|}

13th–16th semifinals

|}

15th place match

|}

Women

Group C

|}

|}

Quarterfinals

|}

Semifinals

|}

3rd place match

|}

See also
Brazil at the 2015 Pan American Games

Nations at the 2015 Summer Universiade
2015
Universiade